Back in Time for... is a British lifestyle television series produced by Wall to Wall and broadcast on BBC Two from 17 March 2015. Each series takes one "typical" family or multiple individuals relating to the topic (e.g., factory workers in Back in Time for the Factory) and immerses them in life of past decades.

Overview
The first series, Back in Time for Dinner, centred on the Robshaw family trying foods from the second half of the twentieth century, and experiencing what it was like to live then as a middle-class family. Each hour-long programme covers one decade, and the family's own kitchen, dining, and living rooms were re-designed by the TV team each week to give an accurate representation of what it was like to cook and eat then.

The second series, Back in Time for the Weekend, featured different participants, the middle-class Ashby Hawkins family, spending a week living through different decades from the 1950s to the 1990s and experiencing leisure time from the differing eras.

On 14 and 15 December 2015, a two-part Christmas special titled Back in Time for Christmas was broadcast which featured the Robshaw family trying Christmas food from the 1940s, 1950s and 1960s (Episode 1) and the 1970s, 1980s and 1990s (Episode 2).

A special edition of the show titled Back in Time for Brixton and consisting of two episodes, aired on BBC Two in November 2016. This focused on a black British family called the Irwins "through 60 years of cultural and social shifts, charting the story of how African-Caribbean immigration has changed British culture and society".

A sequel to the first series, titled Further Back in Time for Dinner, returns to the first family, the Robshaws, pushing them half a century earlier, beginning in 1900 and ending in 1949. The series was first broadcast on Tuesday 23 January 2017.

Back in Time for Tea This began airing in February 2018. This series focuses on the food and lifestyle of working-class Northern households, exemplified by the Ellis family, from post-World War I through to the end of the 1990s.

A fifth series, Back in Time for the Factory, consisted of five episodes and aired on BBC Two in September 2018. These episodes looked at modern-day workers experiencing work in a garment factory in the 1960s, 1970s and 1980s, with each episode focusing on a specific year.

A sixth series, entitled Back in Time for School, aired its first episode in January 2019. This series followed a group of students and teachers experiencing school during different time periods from the 1890s to 1990s.

A seventh series, Back in Time for the Corner Shop, began airing in February 2020.

An eighth series, Back in Time for Birmingham, has been commissioned for broadcast in 2022. The four episodes will be presented by host Noreen Khan and social historian Yasmin Khan, and will "follow a modern-day family of South Asian Brits Back In Time to experience what life in the city would have been like for previous generations."
It was broadcast on BBC Two, and ran for four episodes (over consecutive nights) Monday 20 June till Thursday 23 June 2022. It features the Sharma family.

Broadcast
The series debuted in the UK on BBC Two on 17 March 2015. Internationally, the series premiered in Australia on The LifeStyle Channel on 24 September 2015. The second series began on 2 February 2016.

Episodes

Series One – Back in Time for Dinner
The first six-episode series was co-presented by restaurant critic Giles Coren and food historian Polly Russell. It followed the Robshaw family - Brandon, his wife Rochelle and their three children, Rosalind, Miranda and Fred.

Christmas Specials – Back in Time for Christmas

Series Two – Back in Time for the Weekend
The second six-episode series was again co-presented by restaurant critic Giles Coren and food historian Polly Russell. It followed the Ashby-Hawkins family, a couple and their two children.

Black and British specials – Back in Time for Brixton

Series Three – Further Back in Time for Dinner
The third six-episode series was again co-presented by restaurant critic Giles Coren and food historian Polly Russell. Series Three saw the return of the Robshaw Family, as they journey even further back into the 20th Century.

Series Four – Back in Time for Tea

The fourth six-episode series was co-presented by Sara Cox, with returning food historian Polly Russell. It followed the Ellis family from Bradford, a couple and their three children. The family was joined by guests throughout the episodes, some who lived the times, for specific cultural references.

Series Five – Back in Time for the Factory

The fifth five-episode series was presented by Alex Jones. It followed the Brabon family from Rhondda in Wales and focused on factory workers throughout the decades of the second half of the 20th century, this time spending each episode in a specific year rather than a whole decade.

Series Six – Back in Time for School

Fifteen pupils and three teachers embark on an extraordinary time-travelling adventure to discover just how much life at school has changed over the past 100 years. The school itself is their time machine, transporting them through seven eras of British history - from Victorian grandeur and the age of Empire through a postwar grammar, a 1960s secondary modern, and finally the dawning of the digital revolution in the 1980s and 1990s. The first three episodes were filmed at Bablake School in Coventry. The next four episodes were shot at Arden Academy, Solihull. The last episode that went back to the present day was filmed at various schools around the Midlands.

Series Seven – Back in Time for the Corner Shop

The Ardern family embark on an extraordinary time-travelling adventure - going back in time to run that great British institution, the corner shop. Sara Cox returned as a presenter alongside Polly Russell.

Series Eight – Back in Time for Birmingham
The series covers the lives of British Asians from the 1950s onward and will be broadcast  over four nights from the 20 June 2022.

International adaptations
An Australian version of Back in Time for Dinner, hosted by Annabel Crabb, premiered on ABC on 29 May 2018. Starting in 1950 in Australia, the seven part series features the Ferrone family, mother Carol, father Peter, 17-year-old son Julian, 14-year-old daughter Sienna and 10-year-old daughter Olivia. A second season Further Back in Time for Dinner  premiered on 1 September 2020. Starting in 1900 in Australia, the five part series features the Ferrone family again. A third season Back in Time for the Corner Shop  premiered on 7 March 2023. Starting from 1850 to 1990 in Australia, the five part series features the Ferrone family once more as they navigate life as corner shop owners.
A Canadian version of Back in Time for Dinner, hosted by Carlo Rota, premiered on CBC Television on 14 June 2018 to 19 July 2018. Starting in 1940 in Canada and finished in 1990s, the seven part series features the Campus family, mother Tristan, a registered nurse, father Aaron, a multimedia designer, 18-year-old  daughter Valerie, 17-year-old daughter Jessica and 15-year-old son Robert.
A second Canadian programme, titled Back in Time for Winter, premiered on CBC Television on 9 January 2020. The series follows the Carlson family, mother Melanie, father Dave, and three daughters, 16-year-old Lauren, 13-year-old Alexandrea, and 12-year-old Chelsey, as they experience a Canadian winter each decade from the 1940s to the 1990s.

References

External links

Website

British cooking television shows
2015 British television series debuts
2010s British television series
2020s British television series
Historical reality television series
English-language television shows
BBC Television shows
Television series by Warner Bros. Television Studios
Warner Bros. Television Studios franchises
BBC television documentaries about history during the 20th Century